Motuaiko Island is the only island within Lake Taupō on the North Island of New Zealand. It sits near the town of Motutere. The name "Motutaiko" is from the Māori language, with "motu" meaning island, and "taiko" being a name for the black petrel (Procellaria parkinsoni).

Natural features

Geology
Motutaiko Island is formed out of a column of rhyolitic lava, connected to the geologic systems of the Taupō Volcano.
 There has recently been little volcanic seismicity directly under Motutaiko Island compared to adjacent areas of Lake Taupo.

Biology
Several endangered species live on the island, including Wainuia clarki. Other animals present on the island include a colony of cormorants and the small-scaled skink.  The type specimen for this small skink was captured there in 1971 before being found elsewhere in the central North Island.  Its bellbird population was preserved during the species great dieback after European colonisation and may have allowed more rapid repopulation in the Taupō area.

Maori tradition
The island is spiritually significant to the Māori people, and landing on the island is therefore prohibited by the government. Te Rangi-tua-matotoru, a major chief of the Ngāti Tūwharetoa, was buried in a sacred cave on the island in the late 18th century.

The taniwha of Lake Taupō, named Horomatangi, is said to live in a cave on the island's northeastern face. The creature is also said to be the pet of Ngātoro-i-rangi.

References

Islands of Waikato
Volcanic islands of New Zealand
Taupō District
Māori mythology
Lake Taupō
Taupō Volcanic Zone